Euryestola freyi is a species of beetle in the family Cerambycidae. It was described by Breuning in 1955. It is known from Trinidad and Tobago.

References

Calliini
Beetles described in 1955